Cumulibacter is a Gram-positive genus of bacteria from the family of Geodermatophilaceae. Cumulibacter manganitolerans has been isolated from sludge from a manganese mine.

References

Actinomycetia
Bacteria genera